The Likeaballs is a cartoon created by Jim Quick that airs on BBC One and CBBC. It began production in 2006. It was produced by Cosgrove Hall Films.

Themes
The show is about a group of ball-shaped round hounds whose home planet was destroyed. They take part in football matches. They compete against their deadly rivals The Dislikeaballs.

Characters
All characters names are puns on words ending in "-able", e.g. inflatable is Inflataball etc. The only exceptions being Pam & Dan, spoofs of BBC News 24 sports reporters.

Kickaball 

Inviciball 

Fashionaball 

Laughaball

Stretchaball 

Adoraball 

Reversaball 

Disguisaball 

Knowledgeaball

Manageaball 

Collectaball

Believeaball

Washaball 

Transportaball 

Forgetaball 

Inflateaball 

Count horriball 

Distructaball 

Disagreeaball 

Stealaball 

Combustaball 

Disposeaball 

Miseraball 

Uncontrolaball

Diflateaball

Episode titles
All episode titles are nouns or verbs, e.g. "Hat", Lucky or "Game" etc.
Only 26 episodes were made.

1. Grannits

2. Prisoner

3. Bugbots

4. Giant

5. Slimey

6. Tiddly

7. Ballbasket

8. System

9. Snowy

10. Training

11. Shield

12. Lucky

13. Monopod

14. Guilty

15. Bears

16. Cows

17. Sick

18. Lost

19. Smelly

20. Hat

21. Trophy

22. Manners

23. Scary

24. Truth

25. Robot

26. Television

External links
 

British children's animated sports television series
BBC children's television shows
2006 British television series debuts
2000s British animated television series
2000s British children's television series
Television series by Cosgrove Hall Films